Hugo Spadafora Franco (September 6, 1940 – September 13, 1985) was an Italian and Panamanian physician and guerrilla fighter in Guinea-Bissau and Nicaragua.  He criticized the military in Panama, which led to his murder by the government of Manuel Noriega in 1985.

Biography
Born in Chitré, Spadafora was a physician, graduated from the University of Bologna, in Italy.  He served as a combat medic with the independence guerrilla of Guinea-Bissau during the Guinea-Bissau War of Independence.   Originally a critic of the military regime headed by Omar Torrijos, he served as its Vice-Minister of Health. In 1978, he organized the Victoriano Lorenzo Brigade, formed by a group of Panamanian fighters to fight against the Anastasio Somoza Debayle regime in Nicaragua.

Concerned about the increased Soviet and Cuban influence in the Sandinista regime of Nicaragua and the delay of free elections, Spadafora joined the Sandino Revolutionary Front (FRS) alongside Edén Pastora ("Comandante Cero"), hero of the August 1978 seizure of Somoza's palace.  The rise of Manuel Noriega as authoritarian ruler of Panama compelled Spadafora to denounce Noriega's protection of drug trafficking. Spadafora was detained by Noriega's forces when entering Panama from Costa Rica in September 1985, and his decapitated body was later found stuffed in a post office bag. The autopsy later found Spadafora's stomach full of the blood he had ingested during the slow severing of his head. He had also endured hours of severe torture, as is quoted in Gary Webb's Dark Alliance: "His body bore evidence of unimaginable tortures. The thigh muscles had been neatly sliced so he could not close his legs, and then something had been jammed up his rectum, tearing it apart. His testicles were swollen horribly, the result of prolonged garroting, his ribs were broken, and then, while he was still alive, his head had been sawed off with a butcher's knife." His head was never found. President Nicolás Ardito Barletta tried to set up a commission to investigate the murder but was forced to resign by Noriega, which increased suspicions that the military had ordered the beheading.

It was not until the administration of President Guillermo Endara in 1989, that a court found Noriega (in absentia) and other followers guilty of a conspiracy to murder Spadafora.  In 2014, his biography "Hugo Spadafora: Bajo la Piel del Hombre" was published by Amir Valle, a Cuban journalist, literary critic and writer exhiled in Germany.

Notes

References 
 

1940 births
1985 deaths
People from Chitré
Panamanian people of Italian descent
Panamanian military doctors
Panamanian murder victims
Panamanian activists
Guerrilla warfare theorists
Panamanian torturees
People murdered in Panama
People of the Nicaraguan Revolution
Deaths by decapitation
University of Bologna alumni